Pokémon Diamond and Pearl are role-playing games for the Nintendo DS.

Diamond and Pearl or Diamonds and Pearls may also refer to:
 Pokémon Brilliant Diamond and Shining Pearl, remakes for the Nintendo Switch

Television 
 Pokémon the Series: Diamond and Pearl, the tenth season of the Pokémon anime

Music 
 Diamonds and Pearls, an album by Prince
 "Diamonds and Pearls" (song), a song from the album
 Diamonds and Pearls Video Collection, a video collection album
 "Diamonds and Pearls", a song by Monrose
 "Diamonds and Pearls", a song by Kansas